Karolina Bielawska  (born 11 April 1999) is a Polish model, television presenter and beauty queen who was crowned Miss World 2021. She became the second titleholder from Poland, the first one being Aneta Kręglicka who won the pageant in 1989.

Personal life 
Bielawska was born in Łódź. She is a business student with a bachelor's degree in management and she is studying for her master's degree.

She is the daughter of Agnieszka Zakrzewska-Bielawska, dean of the Faculty of Organization and Management of the Lodz University of Technology, and Łukasz Bielawski, former president of ŁKS Łódź.

Pageantry

Miss Polonia 2019 
On 24 November 2019, Bielawska represented Łódź at Miss Polonia 2019 and won the title, which made her Poland's Miss World 2020 candidate. Miss World 2020 was cancelled due to the COVID-19 pandemic. She retained the Miss World Poland 2021 title.

After winning the elections, she engaged in charity activities, such as volunteering for "Soup na Pietrynie", initiator of the Polish National Charity Action "Korona z Głowy" supporting those in need during the pandemic, ambassador of the social campaign "Dotykam = Wygrywam" acting to fight breast cancer and a participant in the "FASS OFF" campaign for the Dom Foundation in Łódź. She supports the Great Orchestra of Christmas Charity and the DKMS Foundation, is an ambassador of the charity action fighting COVID-19 in Peru, the action included in the Ministry of Foreign Affairs "Polonia4Neighbors", and as part of the charity project "Beauty with a purpose" together with the Foundation "Zupa na Pietrynie" created the first bathhouse in Łódź for people who are homeless.

Miss World 2021 
Bielawska represented Poland at Miss World 2021 held at the Coca-Cola Music Hall in San Juan, Puerto Rico on 16 March 2022, when she won the pageant. She became the second Pole to win Miss World after Aneta Kręglicka got the title in 1989.

See also
List of Poles

References

External links 

1999 births
Living people
Miss World winners
Miss World 2021 delegates
Polish beauty pageant winners
Polish female models
Polish women television presenters
People from Łódź
Łódź University of Technology alumni
Miss Polonia winners